Ćatić is a Bosnian surname. Notable people with the surname include:   
  
Amar Ćatić (born 1999), Bosnian footballer
Adnan Catic (footballer) (born 2000), Swedish footballer of Bosnian descent
Adnan Ćatić (born 1979), German boxer of Bosnian descent
Bego Ćatić (born 1963), Bosnian footballer and manager
Dženan Ćatić (born 1992), Bosnian-American footballer 
Sanela Diana Jenkins (née Ćatić), Bosnian  entrepreneur and philanthropist
Hajrudin Ćatić (born 1975), German–Bosnian footballer
Musa Ćazim Ćatić (1878–1915), Bosnian writer and poet
Ned Catic, former Australian rugby league player

See also 

 Čatići (Kakanj)

 Čatići (Banovići)

Bosnian surnames